I 2 deputati (Italian for "The two deputies") is a 1968 comedy film written and directed by Giovanni Grimaldi and starring the comic duo Franco and Ciccio.

Cast 

Franco Franchi as Franco Franchini
Ciccio Ingrassia as  Francesco Grassiani
Gabriella Giorgelli as  Rosa
 Franca Maria Giardina as  Rita
Paolo Carlini as  Dr. Bianchini
Didi Perego as  Grassiani's Secretary
Umberto D'Orsi as  Ugo Latterin
Ignazio Leone as   Franco's Colleague
Alfredo Rizzo as   Dr. Lucarini
Renato Malavasi as   Commendator Frascati
Ignazio Balsamo as  PCI Member
  as   PCI Member
Enzo Andronico as   PCI Member
  as  DC Member
Lino Banfi as  Franco's Friend
Enzo Maggio as  The Doorman
Luca Sportelli as    Journalist

References

External links

1960s buddy comedy films
Films directed by Giovanni Grimaldi
Films scored by Piero Umiliani
Italian buddy comedy films
1960s political comedy films
1960s Italian-language films
1968 films
Italian political comedy films
1960s Italian films